"Ooh Yeah" is a song by American electronica musician Moby. It was released as the fourth and final single from his eighth studio album Last Night on November 23, 2008, as a digital download.

Music video 

The "Ooh Yeah" music video was directed by Matteo Bernardini. It starts out on the set of a pornography video shoot. People are getting ready and rushing around while the director is smoking and the makeup artist is applying makeup to some of the porn stars (whose names are Angelica La Lapin (Angel Rabbit), Crystal Menthe (Crystal Meth), Foxy Candy, and Bunny). Then the movie begins shooting. The pizza boy (whose name is Big Rod) is called by two of the girls. He brings them over pizza and then starts having wild sexual intercourse with them. This continues until the end of the music video.

Track listing 
 Digital single
 "Ooh Yeah"  – 3:38
 "Ooh Yeah"  – 4:53
 "Ooh Yeah"  – 6:33
 "Ooh Yeah"  – 7:52
 "Ooh Yeah"  – 8:16
 "Ooh Yeah"  – 7:28

Charts

References

External links 
 

2008 singles
Moby songs
Songs written by Moby
Mute Records singles
2008 songs